Pursglove is an unincorporated community in Monongalia County, West Virginia, United States and one of the communities that make up the Scotts Run region. Pursglove has a post office with ZIP code 26546.

Gallery of photos from Pursglove in the 1940s

See also
The Shack Neighborhood House

References

Unincorporated communities in Monongalia County, West Virginia
Unincorporated communities in West Virginia
Coal towns in West Virginia